Wicked is a 1986 album by Barb Jungr and Michael Parker.

Track listing 
All tracks composed by Barb Jung and Michael Parker; except where noted
"Bad Things Come in Threes" 
"Don't Sacrifice Me" 
"No News is Good News" (Michael Parker)
"That Black Cat" 
"In Soho Late at Night" 
"Too Much for Me"
"Just the Wisky Talking" 
"Perfect Pair" 
"The Begging Game" 
"Over a Low Flame" 
"You Can't Win Them All" 
"An Empty Bottle"

Band members 
Musicians
Barb Jungr - vocals, harmonica
Michael Parker - guitar, harmonica
Paul Zetter - bass guitar
Other personnel
Lin Jammet - art
Honey Salvadori - photography

External links 
Barb Jungr — Official website

1986 debut albums
Barb Jungr albums